Oramia is a genus of South Pacific funnel weavers first described by Raymond Robert Forster in 1964.

Species
 it contains eight species:

Oramia chathamensis (Simon, 1899) – New Zealand (Chatham Is.)
Oramia frequens (Rainbow, 1920) – Australia (Lord Howe Is.)
Oramia littoralis Forster & Wilton, 1973 – New Zealand
Oramia mackerrowi (Marples, 1959) – New Zealand
Oramia marplesi Forster, 1964 – New Zealand (Auckland Is.)
Oramia occidentalis (Marples, 1959) – New Zealand
Oramia rubrioides (Hogg, 1909) – New Zealand
Oramia solanderensis Forster & Wilton, 1973 – New Zealand

References

External links

Agelenidae
Araneomorphae genera
Spiders of New Zealand
Taxa named by Raymond Robert Forster